Maor Tiyouri (born 13 August 1990) is an Israeli Olympic long-distance runner, former national record holder of Israel in the  5000 metres, and a three-time Israeli national champion – in the 1,500 m and 5,000 m in 2013, and the 1500 m in 2015.

Early life
Tiyouri is a native of Kfar Saba, Israel, and her family is of Jewish descent.  Her parents are Gideon and Irit Tiyouri. She attended Galili High School.

College
Tiyouri studied at the University of San Francisco, majoring in Exercise and Sport Science. She competed with the San Francisco Dons as a member of four consecutive WCC cross country champion teams, made two trips to the NCAA Cross Country Championships with the team, and made two 10,000-meter semifinal appearances.  She graduated in 2014.

In 2011 Tiyouri was the top runner at the West Coast Conference Individual Championship with a time of 35:16.57 in the 10,000 m, and in 2012 she won the West Coast Invitational 10,000 m. In 2013, she came in third in the 1500 m with a time of 4:31.91 at the Brutus Hamilton Invitational and second in the 5000 m at the West Coast Invitational 11 May with a time of 16:30.35, and in 2014 she came in second in the 3000 m at the Cal Opener with a time of 9:40.32. She was First Team All-West Coast Conference in 2010, 2011, and 2013, and All-West Coast Conference Honorable Mention in 2013. In 2013, she received the Breakthrough Performance Award at University of San Francisco.

She became the second Olympian, following Haley Nemra who represented the Marshall Islands in the 2008 and 2012 Olympic Games in the women's 800 meters, to come out of the university's track & field team coached by Helen Lehman-Winters. Tiyouri was one of three University of San Francisco alumni to compete in the 2016 Olympics, joined by basketball player John Cox and synchronized swimmer Mariya Koroleva.

Maccabiah Games
Tiyouri was the silver medalist in the 1500 m and a bronze medalist in the 800 m at the 2009 Maccabiah Games, and a silver medalist in the 3000 m at the 2013 Maccabiah Games.

Israeli championships and records
She is a three-time Israeli national champion: in 2013 in the 1500 m and 5000 m, and in 2015 in the 1500 m. Tiyouri is also the Israeli record holder in the 5000 m, with a time of 16:08.83 set at the 2015 Mt. SAC Relays.

European Games and Ottawa Marathon
At the 2015 European Games, Tiyouri was second in the 1500 (personal best of 4:26.86) and 3000 (personal best of 9:32.11), helping Israel win the bronze medal. On 29 May 2016, she finished the Ottawa Marathon, her first-ever marathon, with a time of 2:42:20 hours, and placed 7th. On the basis of her time, she qualified to represent Israel at the 2016 Summer Olympics.

Olympics
Tiyouri qualified to represent Israel at the 2016 Olympics in the women's marathon in Rio de Janeiro. She finished with a time of 2:47:27 hours, 90th out of 133 competitors, as the race was won by Jemima Jelagat Sumgong of Kenya in a time of 2:24:04 hours. Tiyouri placed 48th out of 91 women in Sapporo at Athletics at the 2020 Summer Olympics – Women's marathon and she finished with a time of 2:37:52.

World Championships
Tiyouri qualified to represent Israel at the 2017 World Championships in Athletics in the 2017 World Championships in Athletics – Women's marathon in London where she placed 63rd in a time of 2:49:45.

References

External links
 
 
 
 
 

1990 births
Living people
Israeli female middle-distance runners
Israeli female long-distance runners
Israeli female marathon runners
Competitors at the 2009 Maccabiah Games
Competitors at the 2013 Maccabiah Games
Maccabiah Games silver medalists for Israel
Maccabiah Games bronze medalists for Israel
Athletes (track and field) at the 2015 European Games
European Games medalists in athletics
European Games bronze medalists for Israel
Athletes (track and field) at the 2016 Summer Olympics
Olympic athletes of Israel
Maccabiah Games medalists in athletics
Israeli people of Jewish descent
Athletes (track and field) at the 2020 Summer Olympics
People from Kfar Saba
20th-century Israeli women
21st-century Israeli women